The Serbia national korfball team is managed by the Korfbol savez Srbije, representing Serbia in korfball international competitions. Is member of IKF since 2005.

Tournament history

Current squad
National team in the 2009 European Bowl

 Coach: Peter Van Vliet

References

External links
Korfbol savez Srbije
Korfbol – sport budućnosti

National korfball teams
Korfball
National team